KunstTour is a yearly art festival in Maastricht, Netherlands. During the weekend of the festival, which is usually in spring, a lot of galleries and workshops open their doors to the public for free. Artists then get the chance to expose their work, and the visitors can see the workplaces of the artists. Visitors can be brought to different locations on a free bus.

KunstTour is organized by Art2Connect, with financial support from the City of Maastricht, the Province of Limburg (Netherlands), Ateliers Maastricht and Businesslife.

Editions 
The year 2005 was a controversial edition for the KunstTour. The main location that year was a squatter's house. The opening took place on the Friday night, with officials of local and provincial government, when a party started. At 3 o'clock in the morning, the party was stopped by police because they didn't have proper permission for the property.

In 2006 the KunstTour took place May 19-21. The main location was the Statenkwartier (in the centre of Maastricht), with the filmhouse Lumière as the central point. The theme was Urban Myths.

In 2007 the KunstTour took place May 26-28.

External links 
 KunstTour.com

Festivals in the Netherlands